Käärikmäe is a settlement in Valga Parish, Valga County in southern Estonia.

References

Villages in Valga County
Kreis Werro